Austrodaphnella yemenensis is a species of sea snail, a marine gastropod mollusk in the family Raphitomidae.

Description
The length of the shell attains 8.6 mm, its diameter 3.7 mm.

Distribution
This marine species occurs in Southern Red Sea off Yemen.

References

 Bonfitto, A., Sabelli, B. & Morassi, M. (2001) Austrodaphnella yemenensis new species (Gastropoda: Turridae) from Yemen, Red Sea, with notes on A. alcestis (Melvill, 1906). The Nautilus, 115, 84–89

External links
 
 Worldwide Mollusc Species Data Base: image

yemenensis
Gastropods described in 2001